Baeospora is a genus of mushroom-producing fungi. It is variously classified in the families Tricholomataceae or Marasmiaceae, though as of 2007, these groups are undergoing revision. It has been found to fall into the "hydropoid clade" (Hydropus and allies), though no formal Linnaean taxon has been designated based on this classification. The genus was circumscribed by mycologist Rolf Singer in 1938. The most recently described species, B. occidentalis, is a snowbank fungus that was discovered in montane coniferous forests of the western USA.

Species

See also
List of Marasmiaceae genera

References

Marasmiaceae
Agaricales genera
Taxa named by Rolf Singer